Diesel Guitar (ディーゼル・ギター) is the solo noise music project of  (born 1967), who runs the independent noise label Good Microphone. The project originated as a duo called "Deisel Guitars".

His first CD, called Stream of Lights, was released in 2002. It features material recorded between 10/1998 and 6/2001. Tracks 1 through 4 are recorded live and tracks 5 and 6 are recorded in the studio. Noseyama uses reverb, analog effects and Morley Pedals.

Discography
As Diesel Guitar
 Nacht und Nebel (1994, 7")
 Maria (1995, cassette)
 Medium of Lights (1996, cassette)
 Stream of Lights (2002, CD)
 Resonance 2003-2010 (2011, CD)
 Maria / Medium of Lights / Assimilation (2017, 3CD compilation)
As Youki Noseyama
 Kaze no Utsuwa (風の器) (2012, CD)
 Matter and Life (2017, LP)
As Deisel Guitars
 Materialism Rock (1992, cassette)
 Atom (1993, cassette)
 Double Minds String (split with Sian) (1994, cassette)

See also
List of Japanoise artists

References

Japanese noise rock groups